Pârâul Frumos may refer to the following rivers in Romania:

 Pârâul Frumos (Olt), tributary of the Olt River
 Pârâul Frumos (Putna), tributary of the Putna River